Agra is a town in northern Lincoln County, Oklahoma, United States.  The population was 339 at the 2010 census. An early real estate developer coined the town's name from the word "agriculture".

History
Agra began to form around the turn of 20th Century. A post office opened in Agra on December 20, 1902, with Isaac C. Pierce serving as the first postmaster.  The Missouri, Kansas and Oklahoma Railroad (which later became part of the Missouri, Kansas and Texas Railway (also known as MKT or "Katy") built a line from Oklahoma City to Parsons, Kansas between 1902 and 1904. The townsite was developed after two local farmers, Frank Wheeler and Sam Holder, sold their lands along the railroad.  American Land Loan and Trust Company divided the site into town lots.

The first businesses in town were a drugstore, opened by John Olmstead and a general store opened by Mark Crane. Otherwise, the first buildings were houses and a few churches. The Bank of Agra was built in 1904.{{The Bank of Agra was listed in the National Register of Historic Places (NR 90000122). Attempts to save the bank building, failed due to its deterioration, and it was razed in August 1999.}}  School was taught in churches until 1905, when the first school building was constructed. By 1918, the town had also added the Commercial Hotel and a cotton gin. Early newspapers published in Agra were the Agra News and the Queen City Times. However, both the nickname and the newspaper passed into oblivion many years ago.

In the 21st Century, most of the permanent residents have been employed by the oil and gas industry, and/or commuted to work in other towns. Agra is essentially a bedroom community. It is now a small country town, but has 3 churches, a restaurant, elementary and high school, post office, and convenience store.

Geography
Agra is located at  (35.894279, -96.870956).

Demographics

At the 2010 census, there were 339 people living in the town.  The population density was 1,007.3 per square mile (392.7/km). There were 152 housing units at an average density of 417 per square mile (163/km).  The racial makeup of the town was 89.61% White, 5.90% Native American, and 4.49% are from two or more races.

There were 131 households, of which 36.6% had children under the age of 18 living with them, 61.8% were married couples living together, 9.2% had a female householder with no husband present, and 24.4% were non-families. 23.7% of all households were made up of individuals, and 12.2% had someone living alone who was 65 years of age or older. The average household size was 2.72 and the average family size was 3.18.

Age distribution was 30.1% under the age of 18, 11.0% from 18 to 24, 23.6% from 25 to 44, 21.3% from 45 to 64, and 14.0% who were 65 years of age or older. The median age was 31 years. For every 100 females, there were 104.6 males. For every 100 females age 18 and over, there were 100.8 males.

The median household income was $25,750, and the median family income was $30,781. Males had a median income of $24,375 versus $12,344 for females. The per capita income for the town was $9,997. About 20.6% of families and 27.1% of the population were below the poverty line, including 36.4% of those under age 18 and 12.3% of those age 65 or over.

Education
Agra is served by the Agra Independent School District.

Notes

References

External links
 Encyclopedia of Oklahoma History and Culture - Agra
 Oklahoma Digital Maps: Digital Collections of Oklahoma and Indian Territory

Towns in Lincoln County, Oklahoma
Towns in Oklahoma
Populated places established in 1904